Đorđe Bajić (born 23 April 1977) is a Serbian football player who played for BVSC Budapest.

References

 Futballévkönyv 1999 [Football Yearbook 1999], Volume I, pp. 78–82., Aréna 2000 kiadó, Budapest, 2000 

1977 births
Living people
Serbia and Montenegro footballers
Serbia and Montenegro expatriate footballers
Serbian footballers
Serbian expatriate footballers
Expatriate footballers in Hungary
Association football midfielders
FK Radnički Niš players
Budapesti VSC footballers
Serbia and Montenegro expatriate sportspeople in Hungary